The 1982 Grambling State Tigers football team represented Grambling State University as a member of the Southwestern Athletic Conference (SWAC) during the 1982 NCAA Division I-AA football season. Led by 40th-year head coach Eddie Robinson, the Tigers compiled an overall record of 8–3 and a mark of 4–2 in conference play, and finished third in the SWAC. Coach Robinson won his 300th all time game with the Tigers 43–21 win over Florida A&M on September 25.

Schedule

References

Grambling State
Grambling State Tigers football seasons
Grambling State Tigers football